Copernicia hospita is a palm which is endemic to Cuba.

Description
The circular blue gray waxy leaves of the Cuban wax palm, spread out like fans on long, thin, stems (petioles). Up to 40 leaves form a very characteristic circular outline, around the top of the trunk. The smooth columnar trunk can grow up to 1 ft (0.3 m) in diameter, and up to 26 ft (7.9 m) tall. Dainty brown flowers extend, past the leaves on uniquely hairy branches. This species of Copernicia is monoecious, flowers are bisexual. The fruits resemble black marbles, up to 1 in (2.5 m) across.

References

hospita
Trees of Cuba